Magyardombegyház is a village in Békés County, in the Southern Great Plain region of south-east Hungary.

In the 19th century, a small Jewish community lived in the village, many of whose members were murdered in the Holocaust,

Geography
It covers an area of 7.64 km² and has a population of 237 people (2015).

References

Populated places in Békés County
Jewish communities destroyed in the Holocaust